PNS Aslat (FFG-254) is a F-22P Zulfiquar-class guided missile frigate currently in active service with the Pakistan Navy since her commission in 2013.

Operational history

Aslats design, construction and the steel cutting took place in KSEW, Ltd. in Karachi, Sindh in Pakistan in 2009. Her keel laying and launch ceremony took place on 16 June 2011 with Adm. Noman Bashir witnessing its ceremony.

On 18 April 2013, Aslat was commissioned into the military service of the Pakistan Navy and was presented with her colors by Adm. Asif Sandila. With the commissioning of the Aslat, the project of building the Zulfiquar-class guided missile frigates concluded the $750 million technology transfer contract with China.
 
The second warship has the namesake of Aslat, which is a type of Arab sword used by Arab warriors in the Early Islamic conquests.

Gallery

References

 

F-22P Zulfiquar-class frigate
2011 ships
Ships built in Pakistan